Siphlophis cervinus (checkerbelly) is a rare snake found in Amazonian South America and Trinidad and Tobago.

References

Colubrids
Reptiles of Trinidad and Tobago
Fauna of Brazil
Fauna of the Amazon
Reptiles described in 1768
Taxa named by Josephus Nicolaus Laurenti